Gateway Community & Technical College is a public community college in Covington, Kentucky. It is part of the Kentucky Community and Technical College System (KCTCS). Gateway enrolls nearly 4,000 students. The college provides transfer and career education and training and offers more than 200 associate degrees, diplomas and certificates in 30 subject areas. Classes are provided at three Gateway locations in Boone County, Covington, and Edgewood. Through partnerships with more than 400 local businesses, Gateway provides customized, short-term training to more than 3,000 other people.

Gateway is accredited by the Commission on Colleges of the Southern Association of Colleges and Schools to award associate degrees. Gateway is also accredited by the Council on Occupational Education.

Service area
The primary service area of Gateway includes:

Boone County
Campbell County
Grant County
Kenton County
Pendleton County

External links
Official website

Education in Boone County, Kentucky
Education in Kenton County, Kentucky
Buildings and structures in Boone County, Kentucky
Buildings and structures in Covington, Kentucky
Kentucky Community and Technical College System
Educational institutions established in 2002
Universities and colleges accredited by the Southern Association of Colleges and Schools
Greater Cincinnati Consortium of Colleges and Universities
2002 establishments in Kentucky